The 2019–20 Liga IV Teleorman (Liga IV Fortuna Sports for sponsorship reasons) was the 52nd season of the Liga IV Teleorman, the fourth tier of the Romanian football league system. The season began on 30 August 2019 and was scheduled to end in June 2020, but was suspended in March because of the COVID-19 pandemic in Romania.

The season was ended officially on 20 July 2020 after AJF Teleorman (County Football Association) concluding that the teams could not meet the medical conditions imposed by the medical protocol. Unirea Țigănești was crowned as county champion.

Team changes

To Liga IV Teleorman
Relegated from Liga III
 —

Promoted from Liga V Teleorman
 Inter Purani
 Steaua Spătărei
 Avântul Stejaru
 Cetatea Turnu Măgurele

From Liga IV Teleorman
Promoted to Liga III
 —

Relegated to Liga V Teleorman
 —

Other changes
 Unirea Brânceni, Dunărea Zimnicea and Inter Purani they withdrew because of financial problems.
 Unirea Moșteni and Atletic Orbeasca were spared from relegation

League table

Promotion play-off

Champions of Liga IV – Teleorman County face champions of Liga IV – Olt County and Liga IV – Vâlcea County.

Region 5 (South–West)

Group B

See also

Main Leagues
 2019–20 Liga I
 2019–20 Liga II
 2019–20 Liga III
 2019–20 Liga IV

County Leagues (Liga IV series)

 2019–20 Liga IV Alba
 2019–20 Liga IV Arad
 2019–20 Liga IV Argeș
 2019–20 Liga IV Bacău
 2019–20 Liga IV Bihor
 2019–20 Liga IV Bistrița-Năsăud
 2019–20 Liga IV Botoșani
 2019–20 Liga IV Brăila
 2019–20 Liga IV Brașov
 2019–20 Liga IV Bucharest
 2019–20 Liga IV Buzău
 2019–20 Liga IV Călărași
 2019–20 Liga IV Caraș-Severin
 2019–20 Liga IV Cluj
 2019–20 Liga IV Constanța
 2019–20 Liga IV Covasna
 2019–20 Liga IV Dâmbovița
 2019–20 Liga IV Dolj 
 2019–20 Liga IV Galați
 2019–20 Liga IV Giurgiu
 2019–20 Liga IV Gorj
 2019–20 Liga IV Harghita
 2019–20 Liga IV Hunedoara
 2019–20 Liga IV Ialomița
 2019–20 Liga IV Iași
 2019–20 Liga IV Ilfov
 2019–20 Liga IV Maramureș
 2019–20 Liga IV Mehedinți
 2019–20 Liga IV Mureș
 2019–20 Liga IV Neamț
 2019–20 Liga IV Olt
 2019–20 Liga IV Prahova
 2019–20 Liga IV Sălaj
 2019–20 Liga IV Satu Mare
 2019–20 Liga IV Sibiu
 2019–20 Liga IV Suceava
 2019–20 Liga IV Timiș
 2019–20 Liga IV Tulcea
 2019–20 Liga IV Vâlcea
 2019–20 Liga IV Vaslui
 2019–20 Liga IV Vrancea

References

External links
 Official website 

 
Sport in Teleorman County